Kumgeçit is a village in the Beşiri District of Batman Province in Turkey. The village is populated by Kurds of the Elîkan tribe and had a population of 48 in 2021. The hamlet of Meydancık is attached to the village.

Both Kumgeçit and Meydancık are populated by Yazidis.

References 

Villages in Beşiri District
Kurdish settlements in Batman Province
Yazidi villages in Turkey